Durakov (from дурак meaning a fool) is a Russian masculine surname, its feminine counterpart is Durakova. Notable people with the surname include:

Nikolay Durakov (born 1934), Soviet bandy player

Russian-language surnames